Örkelljunga is a locality and the seat of Örkelljunga Municipality, Skåne County, Sweden with 10,300 inhabitants in 2020.

After the municipal reform of 1862, Örkelljunga was part of Örkelljunga Landskommun. In this, Örkelljunga municipal community was established for the town on 4 August 1911 and dissolved on 31 December 1952. Since 1971, the village has been part of Örkelljunga Municipality as a central town.

References 

Municipal seats of Skåne County
Swedish municipal seats
Populated places in Skåne County
Populated places in Örkelljunga Municipality
20th-century establishments in Skåne County